Susan Harris is an American television producer.

Susan Harris may also refer to:

Susan Harris, a fictional character from the movie Invasion of the Bee Girls
Susan Harris, a fictional character from the movie Demon Seed, played by Julie Christie
Sue Harris, English folk musician